This was the first edition of the tournament.

Pablo Andújar won the title after defeating Alex de Minaur 7–6(7–5), 6–1 in the final.

Seeds

Draw

Finals

Top half

Bottom half

References
Main Draw
Qualifying Draw

JC Ferrero Challenger Open - Singles